Svälten. Hungeråren som formade Sverige (lit. The Famine: The Years of Hunger that Shaped Sweden) is the fourth book published by Swedish journalist and author Magnus Västerbro. It won the August Prize in 2018 for the category of Best Swedish Non-Fiction.

The book recalls the historical Swedish famine of 1867–1869.

References

Swedish non-fiction books 
Swedish-language novels
Swedish non-fiction literature
August Prize-winning works
Albert Bonniers Förlag books